Antonacci is an Italian surname derived from Antonius. Notable people with the surname include:

 Anna Caterina Antonacci (born 1961), Italian soprano
 Biagio Antonacci (born 1963), Italian singer-songwriter
 Bob Antonacci, properly Robert E. Antonacci, American politician
 Greg Antonacci (born 1947), American television actor, director, producer and writer
 Joe Antonacci (born 1960), American boxing ring announcer

See also

Notes

Italian-language surnames
Patronymic surnames
Surnames from given names